Chiagozie Fred Nwonwu who writes under the pen name Mazi Nwonwu is a Nigerian writer, curator and editor. He is the co-founder and managing editor of Omenana Magazine. In 2017, he was listed as one of the most powerful persons in the media space alongside Stephanie Busari and Fisayo Soyombo by YNaija.

Early life and career
Nwonwu was born in Nkwe, a village in Enugu, Enugu State. He attended the Government College, Kaduna (now Barewa College) then moved on to Nnamdi Azikiwe University to study Linguistics. He has worked as the managing editor at Olisa.tv. He co-founded Omenana Magazine in 2014 with Chinelo Onwualu. He is also a journalist at BBC. BBC described him as one of the new author's writing Nigeria. He is considered to be among the third generation of Nigerian writers.

References

Living people
Nigerian journalists
Nigerian fantasy writers
21st-century Nigerian writers
Nigerian writers
Barewa College alumni
BBC newsreaders and journalists
Nnamdi Azikiwe University alumni
Year of birth missing (living people)